Maurice Paul Delorme (November 20, 1919 – December 27, 2012) was a French prelate of the Roman Catholic Church.

Delorme was born in Lyon, and ordained to the priesthood on October 11, 1942, in Lyon. He was appointed auxiliary bishop of the Archdiocese of Lyon as well as titular bishop of Ottocium on October 2, 1975, and ordained a bishop on November 16, 1975. Delorme remained auxiliary bishop of Lyon until his retirement on December 3, 1994, and continued to serve as titular bishop of Ottocium until his death in Lyon, aged 93.

References

External links
Catholic-Hierarchy
Diocese site of Lyon (French)

20th-century Roman Catholic bishops in France
1919 births
2012 deaths
Auxiliary bishops of Lyon